The badminton competition at the 2002 Commonwealth Games took place at the Bolton Arena in Manchester, England from 25 July until 4 August 2002. There were no bronze medal play off matches because both losing semi-finalists were awarded a bronze medal. This was the only time that the scoring system of 7 points / 5 sets was used for a Commonwealth Games badminton event.

Final Results

Results

Men's singles

Women's singles

Men's doubles

Women's doubles

Mixed doubles

Mixed Team

Semi finals

Final

References

2002
2002 Commonwealth Games events
2002 in badminton
Badminton tournaments in England